The teams competing in Group 1 of the 2002 UEFA European Under-21 Championships qualifying competition were Russia, Yugoslavia, Switzerland, Slovenia and Luxembourg.

Standings

Matches
All times are CET.

Goalscorers
7 goals

 Spartak Gogniev
 Ricardo Cabanas

5 goals
 Pyotr Bystrov

4 goals

 Ruslan Pimenov
 Daniel Greco
 Bojan Brnović
 Milan Dudić

3 goals

 Damir Pekič
 Daniel Gygax
 Dragan Bogavac
 Andrija Delibašić
 Marjan Marković

2 goals

 Aleksandar Radosavljević
 Branko Bošković

1 goal

 David Chaboissier
 Vasili Berezutski
 Artem Bezrodny
 Marat Izmailov
 Aleksandr Kerzhakov
 Alan Kusov
 Oleg Kuzmin
 Murad Ramazanov
 Uroš Barut
 Mitja Brulc
 Robert Koren
 Goran Šukalo
 Boštjan Žnuderl
 Johann Berisha
 Mario Eggimann
 Alexander Frei
 Ludovic Magnin
 Elvir Melunović
 Remo Meyer
 André Muff
 Reto Zanni
 Ivica Iliev
 Nikola Jolović

External links
 Group 1 at UEFA.com

Group 1